Hadleigh Farm is an educational working farm and cross-country cycling venue located in Hadleigh, within the borough of Castle Point, in the county of Essex. The men's and women's mountain biking events of the 2012 Summer Olympics took place at Hadleigh Farm on 11 and 12 August.

Site
Hadleigh Farm is owned by the Salvation Army and run as an educational working farm. It features a rare breeds centre and tea room for visitors. The  farm was purchased in 1891 by William Booth as part of a plan to rescue the destitute from the squalor of London.

Hadleigh Farm overlooks the Thames Estuary to the south and adjoins Hadleigh Castle, built in the 1230s during the reign of King Henry III, and one of the most important late-medieval castles in Essex, now preserved by English Heritage as a Grade I listed building. A portion of the mountain bike course for the 2012 Olympic and Paralympic Games crosses the adjacent Hadleigh Country Park, owned and managed by Essex County Council and a Site of Special Scientific Interest with special regard for invertebrates.

2012 Summer Olympics

Hadleigh Farm was confirmed in 2008 as the venue for the mountain biking competitions of the cycling programme of the 2012 Summer Olympics. The original proposed venue at Weald Country Park had been deemed insufficiently challenging by the UCI, who were described as being delighted with Hadleigh.

Temporary grandstands seating up to 3,000 people were erected for the Olympics. Following the Olympics the course was adapted for use by the general public, with a new bike shop, cafe, and workshop and broader facilities for the farm. A new mountain bike club based at the farm has been founded  and the course has been used for events including the British National Mountain Bike Championships.

Transport
Plans for improving access to the site for the Olympics included the widening of Castle Lane and Chapel Lane in Hadleigh.
Hadleigh Farm lies along the London, Tilbury and Southend line between Benfleet and Leigh-on-Sea railway stations.

References

External links
 London 2012 venues: Hadleigh Farm
 Salvation Army - Hadleigh Farm website 
 Hadleigh Country Park website
 London 2012: "London 2012 Olympic Mountain Bike venue gets into gear"
 Aerial video of Hadleigh Farm

Tourist attractions in Essex
Castle Point
Parks and open spaces in Essex
Venues of the 2012 Summer Olympics
Sports venues in Essex
The Salvation Army
Olympic cycling venues
Salvation Army buildings
Salvationism in England
Hadleigh, Essex